The Cerami is a river in Sicily. It is located about 10km south of the comune of Cerami and flows into the Salso (a tributary of the Simeto).

References

Rivers of Italy
Rivers of Sicily
Rivers of the Province of Enna